Tesser is a surname. Notable people with the surname include:

Abraham Tesser, American psychologist
Attilio Tesser (born 1958), Italian footballer and manager
Gregory Tesser (born 1946), English journalist
Rafael Tesser (born 1981), Brazilian footballer
Ray Tesser (1912–1982), American football player